Filippo Maria Visconti (3 September 1392 – 13 August 1447) was duke of Milan from 1412 to 1447. Known to be cruel and paranoid, but shrewd as a ruler, he went to war in the 1420s with Romagna, Florence and Venice in the Wars in Lombardy, but was eventually forced to accept peace under Pope Martin V. He would return to the offensive again where another peace agreement was required to end the fighting. He married twice, the second in 1428 to Marie, daughter of his ally Amadeus VIII. When he died, he was the last of the Visconti male line and was succeeded by Francesco Sforza, husband to his daughter.

Biography

Filippo Maria Visconti, who had become nominal ruler of Pavia in 1402, succeeded his assassinated brother Gian Maria Visconti as Duke of Milan in 1412. They were the sons of Gian Galeazzo Visconti, Gian Maria's predecessor, by his second wife, Caterina Visconti. From Filippo's marriage to Beatrice Lascaris di Tenda, Countess of Biandrate and the unhappy widow of Facino Cane—the condottiere who had fomented strife between the factions of Filippo's elder brother and his mother, Caterina Visconti, the regent—Filippo Maria received a dowry of nearly half a million florins; but when Beatrice took too great an interest in affairs of state, he accused her of adultery and had her beheaded at the castle of Binasco in 1418.

Cruel, paranoid and extremely sensitive about his personal ugliness, he was nevertheless a great politician, and by employing such powerful condottieri as Carmagnola, Piccinino—who unsuccessfully led his troops at the Battle of Anghiari, 1440— and Francesco Sforza, he managed to recover the Lombard portion of his father's duchy.

At the death of Giorgio Ordelaffi, lord of Forlì, he took advantage of his guardianship of the boy heir, Tebaldo Ordelaffi, to attempt conquests in Romagna (1423), provoking war with Florence, which could not permit his ambitions to go uncontested. Venice, urged on by Francesco Bussone da Carmagnola, decided to intervene on the side of Florence (1425) and the war spread to Lombardy. In March 1426 Carmagnola fomented riots in Brescia, which he had conquered for Visconti just five years previously. After a long campaign, Venice conquered Brescia, extending its mainland possessions to the western shores of Lake Garda. Filippo Maria unsuccessfully sought imperial aid but was constrained to accept the peace proposed by Pope Martin V, favoring Venice and Carmagnola. The terms were grudgingly accepted in Milan and by the emperor; but hostilities were resumed at the first pretext by Filippo Maria, leading to the defeat of Maclodio (12 October 1427), followed by a more lasting peace signed at Ferrara with the mediation of Niccolò III d'Este, Marquis of Ferrara.

The following year the duke married his second wife Marie of Savoy, Duchess of Milan, daughter of Duke Amadeus VIII of Savoy, a potent ally. With Visconti's support, Amadeus reigned briefly as antipope Felix V from November 1439 to April 1449.

He invited the famous scholar Gasparino Barzizza to establish a school at Milan. Barzizza would also serve as his court orator.

He died in 1447, the last of the Visconti in direct male line, and he was succeeded in the duchy, after the short-lived Ambrosian republic, by Francesco Sforza (1401–1466). In 1441, Francesco married Filippo Maria's only heir, his natural daughter Bianca Maria (1425–1468) by his mistress Agnese del Maino (1401–1465).

Art
The oldest extant Tarot decks, then called carte da trionfi, were probably commissioned by Filippo Maria Visconti.

Ancestors

See also
 Montechino Castle
 Wars in Lombardy
 Vincenzo Bellini's 1833 opera Beatrice di Tenda

References

Sources

1392 births
1447 deaths
Filippo Maria
Dukes of Milan
15th-century Italian nobility
Burials at Milan Cathedral